A People's Deputy of Ukraine is a member of parliament and legislator elected by a popular vote to the Verkhovna Rada (the parliament of Ukraine). Often People's Deputies of Ukraine are referred to simply as the "deputies". However it should be distinguished that regular deputies are members of regional and local councils, while people's deputies are elected to the national parliament, Verkhovna Rada. Prior to 1991, it was named the Supreme Council of People's Deputies of the Ukrainian Soviet Socialist Republic.

The main statutes that define the order of elections, rights and duties of the People's Deputies of Ukraine are outlined in Articles 76 - 81 of the Constitution of Ukraine. There are 450 people's deputies of Ukraine who are elected based on the general, equal and direct electoral right. The deputies may be appointed to various parliamentary positions such as the chairperson (speaker) of the Verkhovna Rada, a head of a committee or a parliamentary faction, etc. Upon its appointment to the office each people's deputy of Ukraine receives a deputy mandate.

People's Deputies that ran for the Verkhovna Rada as self-nominated candidates can join factions if they wish.

Since 2016, in line with new anti-corruption regulations, all senior public officials (thus also people's deputies) must declare their wealth in an electronic database.

Requirements

Requirements to candidates
The People's Deputy of Ukraine may be elected a citizen of Ukraine who at the day of elections turned 21, has the right to vote, and resides within Ukraine for the last five (5) years. There were number of deputies who before being elected to parliament held the citizenship of Ukraine no more than two years. Among them were Dmytro Salamatin, Vadim Novinsky, and others.

A citizen of Ukraine cannot be elected to the Verkhovna Rada if he has a conviction for committing a crime and that conviction is neither extinguished nor taken out of records by the law established order.

Requirements to the deputy's mandate
Each deputy carries out their duties on a continuous base.

A deputy may not possess any other representative mandates, be appointed to the state service, be placed in other salaried positions, participate in other paid or entrepreneurial activity (except for teaching, scientific or artistic), be a member of a governing body or a supervisory council of a company or organization that are for profit. A candidates that was elected into parliament has to submit to the Central Election Commission of Ukraine documents confirming their dismissal from their previous work place within 20 days after the election.

The requirements for the incompatibility of a deputy's mandate with other types of activities are established by the Law.

In case of appearance of circumstances that breach the requirements for the incompatibility of a deputy's mandate with other types of activities, the People's Deputy of Ukraine in a 20-day term from the day of appearance of such circumstances stops that activity or submits a personal statement of resignation as the People's Deputy of Ukraine.

On 13 March 2012 the Constitutional Court of Ukraine declared unconstitutional a ban on the participation of public officials and people's deputies in general meetings of companies or organizations that work for profit.

In October 2016 a requirement was placed upon deputies to declare their wealth. In the first register the 413 deputies cumulatively declared wealth of about $460 million. Reacting to public criticism, deputies cancelled a salary rise that would have doubled their salary. This measure was part of an Anti-Corruption Package passed into law in October 2014, which was a requirement of international financial support for Ukraine.

Oath of office
Before assuming office, the Verkhovna Rada's deputies must take the following oath before the parliament:

In original Ukrainian:

In English translation:

Prior to the 2014 Ukrainian parliamentary election the oath was read by the eldest deputy before the opening of the first session of the newly elected Ukrainian Parliament (Verkhovna Rada), after which deputies affirm the oath by their signatures under its text. At the first session of the newly elected Ukrainian Parliament on 27 November 2014 all the deputies simultaneously read out the oath.

A refusal of taking the oath is followed by the loss (forfeiture) of a deputy's mandate.

An authority of the People's Deputy of Ukraine starts from the moment of taking the oath.

Immunity
Until December 2019 parliamentary immunity was guaranteed to the peoples' deputies of Ukraine.  This meant that deputies could not be held criminally liable, detained or arrested without the agreement of the Verkhovna Rada.

In December 2019, deputies’ immunity was dismantled except that a lawmakers are not legally liable for the results of voting or statements in parliament and its bodies.

Termination of office
The authority of peoples' deputies of Ukraine lapses at the end of the official session (convocation) of the Verkhovna Rada.

The authority of a People's Deputy of Ukraine is terminated early in case of:
 resignation via personal statement
 entry into legal force of a conviction
 court recognition of them being either disabled or absent without notice
 renouncing citizenship or leaving Ukraine for permanent residence abroad
 if in a 20-day term from the day of appearance of such circumstances that breach the requirements for the incompatibility of a deputy's mandate with other types of activities such circumstances are not resolved
 failure of the people's deputy of Ukraine elected by a political party to become affiliated as a member of the parliamentary faction of that party or disaffiliated as a member (the so-called Imperative mandate)
 Their death

The Verkhovna Rada terminates the powers of people's deputies appointed to the Cabinet of Ministers of Ukraine.

Problems among People's Deputies
Deputy's absence from parliamentary meetings is being countered by withholding salary.

Tushky

The term tushky is a popular political term which refers to a member of Verkhovna Rada who participates in party switching.

Knopkodavy

Knopkodavy (lit. "button-pushers") refers to members of Verkhovna Rada who cast a vote for other members of parliament in their absence. Deputies voting for non-present colleagues is notorious in Ukraine and is also referred to as "piano voting". Multiple deputies have stated they could not take part in votes, but nevertheless their votes were registered in parliament. In April 2011 a vote of a deputy was registered although the man had died four days before the voting.

Voting for other deputies became prohibited by law in February 2013. In December 2019, legislation was passed that made "button pushing" punishable by a fine of ₴3,000-5,000. Both measures did little to cut back or prevent the "piano voting". The first attempt to hold an MP legally accountable for "piano-voting" was announced by Prosecutor General of Ukraine Iryna Venediktova on 12 February 2021.

On 2 March 2021, sensor technologies were installed in the Ukrainian parliament that were designed to make it impossible for People's Deputies to vote on behalf of absent colleagues (since they need now to use both their hands for a single vote).

See also
 Corruption in Ukraine#Political corruption
 Deputy (legislator)
 Member of Parliament

References

External links

Verkhovna Rada
Government of Ukraine